The minimum driving age is the minimum age at which a person may obtain a driver's license to lawfully drive a motor vehicle on public roads. That age is determined by and for each jurisdiction and is most commonly set at 18 years of age, but learner drivers may be permitted on the road at an earlier age under supervision. Before reaching the minimum age for a driver's licence or anytime afterward, the person wanting the licence would normally be tested for driving ability and knowledge of road rules before being issued with a licence, provided he or she is above the minimum driving age. Countries with the lowest driving ages (17 and below) are Australia, The Bahamas, Canada, Malaysia, New Zealand, the United Kingdom (mainland), United States, and Zimbabwe. In some jurisdictions in the United States and Canada, drivers can be as young as 14 (with parental supervision).

Most jurisdictions recognize driver's licences issued by another jurisdiction, which may result in a young person who obtains a licence in a jurisdiction with a low minimum driving age being permitted to drive in a jurisdiction that normally has a higher driving age. A notable exception to this is the United States, where many states ban drivers below their minimum driving age, even if they hold permits or licences issued by another state.

The minimum age may vary depending on vehicle type. This list refers to the minimum driving age for a light motor vehicle (typically under 3500 kg gross vehicle mass) or motorcycle, where noted.

Africa

Americas

North America

Central America

South America

Caribbean

Asia

Western Asia

South Asia

East Asia

Southeast Asia

Europe

European Driving Licence Area

Rest of Europe

Oceania

See also 
Youth
Youth suffrage
Youth rights
Age of candidacy
Voting age

References 

Minimum driving ages
Driving ages
Minimum driving ages
Driving Age